Elliott–Carnegie Library is a historic Carnegie library building located at Hickory, Catawba County, North Carolina. It was built in 1922, and is a small, one-story brick veneer structure in the Georgian Revival / Colonial Revival style. It was the last public library in North Carolina to receive a grant from the Carnegie Foundation that funded 2,507 such facilities worldwide. In the 1950s, it was converted for use as radio station WHKY by the Catawba Valley Broadcasting Company.  It later housed an advertising and public relations firm.

It was listed on the National Register of Historic Places in 1985.

References

Hickory, North Carolina
Carnegie libraries in North Carolina
Libraries on the National Register of Historic Places in North Carolina
Library buildings completed in 1922
Georgian Revival architecture in North Carolina
Colonial Revival architecture in North Carolina
Buildings and structures in Catawba County, North Carolina
National Register of Historic Places in Catawba County, North Carolina